Enrico Misso (born 14 July 1964) is a former Australian rules footballer who played with St Kilda in the Victorian Football League (VFL).

Notes

External links 
	

Living people
1964 births
Australian rules footballers from Victoria (Australia)
St Kilda Football Club players
Australian people of Sri Lankan descent
Sri Lankan people of Italian descent
Australian people of Italian descent